Calixto Leicea (1909–2004) was a Cuban musician, arranger and composer.  He was featured as the first trumpeter of the famed group Sonora Matancera.

Cuban musicians
1909 births
2004 deaths